Crassispira borealis is an extinct species of sea snail, a marine gastropod mollusk in the family Pseudomelatomidae, the turrids and allies.

Description
The length of the shell attains 7 mm.

Distribution
Fossils have been found in Pliocene and Miocene strata of Belgium, the Netherlands, Germany, Italy, Denmark and Romania

References

External links
 Naturalis: Pleurotomoides borealis
 Fossilshells.nl: Crassispira borealis

borealis
Gastropods described in 1925